Helton Township is one of nineteen townships in Ashe County, North Carolina, United States. The township had a population of 718 as of the 2010 census.

Helton Township occupies  in northern Ashe County. The township's northern border is with the state of Virginia. There are no incorporated municipalities within Helton Township, but there are several unincorporated communities, including Helton and Sturgills.

References

Townships in Ashe County, North Carolina
Townships in North Carolina